Aquincola is a genus of bacteria from the order of Burkholderiales.

References

Betaproteobacteria
Bacteria genera